Leroy Lewis may refer to:

Leroy Lewis (footballer) (1945-2001), Costa Rican footballer
Leroy Lewis (cricketer) (born 1963), Dominican cricketer